Ohbuka Dam is a gravity dam located in Akita Prefecture in Japan. The dam is used for power production. The catchment area of the dam is 59.5 km2. The dam impounds about 20  ha of land when full and can store 137 thousand cubic meters of water. The construction of the dam was started on 1958 and completed in 1961.

References

Dams in Akita Prefecture
1961 establishments in Japan